Minuscule 190 (in the Gregory-Aland numbering), ε 411 (Soden), is a Greek minuscule manuscript of the New Testament, on parchment. Palaeographically it has been assigned to the 14th century. It has marginalia.

Description 

The codex contains a complete text of the four Gospels on 439 elegant parchment leaves (size ). The text is written in one column per page, in 17 lines per page.

There is also a division according to the smaller Ammonian Sections (in Mark 234 Sections – the last section in 16:9), but without references to the Eusebian Canons.

The text of Mark 16:8-20 is omitted.

Text 

The Greek text of the codex is a representative of the Byzantine text-type. Hermann von Soden included it to the textual family Kx. Aland placed it in Category V.
According to the Claremont Profile Method it creates textual cluster 190 in Luke 1, Luke 10, and Luke 20.

History 

The manuscript is dated by a colophon to the year 1285, but this was added by a later hand.

It was examined by Bandini, Birch, Scholz, and Burgon. C. R. Gregory saw it in 1886.

It is currently housed at the Laurentian Library (Plutei. VI. 28), at Florence.

See also 
 List of New Testament minuscules
 Biblical manuscript
 Textual criticism

References

Further reading 

 

Greek New Testament minuscules
14th-century biblical manuscripts